Aílton José Almeida (born 20 August 1984), simply known as Aílton, is a Brazilian former footballer who played as a forward.

Club career

Örgryte IS
He moved to F.C. Copenhagen from Swedish Örgryte IS on 1 January 2007 for 22 million Danish kroner, which by then was transfer record for a Danish club. Both F.C. Copenhagen and Brøndby IF struggled for Almeida's signature, but after some hesitation from Brøndby IF, he ended up at F.C. Copenhagen.

F.C. Copenhagen

Scoring in his only second game for F.C. Copenhagen against Brøndby IF in one of the New Firm matches, he was considered a new star and a start of a new era for the club, which for many years had suffered from the lack of goals from the strikers, however, he did not manage to follow up his performance, and was subsequently placed on the bench as a substitute. On 15 April 2007, Ailton scored on a bicycle kick in F.C. Copenhagen's 4–2 win over OB, which led to many people thinking he's breakthrough finally was about to come, but yet again, and had to see himself become a substitute.

After the winter break in the 2007–08 season Aílton got a chance in the Danish Cup quarterfinals, where F.C. Copenhagen was to face Næstved BK. He scored a goal in the beginning of the second half following an assist from his countryman José Júnior.

In the beginning of the 2008–09 season he has been playing regularly, becoming an important member of the starting line-up and the attacking play, however, he still has trouble finding the net. He however started against FC Midtjylland on 16 November 2008 and scored two goals. And he scored again against Manchester City in an UEFA Cup match home at Parken. During the season, he scored 11 goals in the league and 4 goals in the cup, being influential in securing the cup and the league titles.

The next season he appeared in 39 matches and scored 8 goals in all competitions, helping F.C. Copenhagen to win the league again, and reach the knockout phase of the season's Europa League.

APOEL

On 28 July 2010, Aílton signed a three-year contract with APOEL. A transfer fee of €700,000 was paid to F.C. Copenhagen, which is the transfer record in the history of APOEL. He made his debut on 5 August 2010 against FK Jablonec in the UEFA Europa League 3rd qualifying round. He scored his first goal with APOEL on 26 August 2010 against Getafe CF on the UEFA Europa League play-off round, in a match which ended 1–1 after extra time. Ailton had a very good first season with APOEL. He played in all championship matches and scored 7 goals, helping his new club to win the 2010–11 Cypriot First Division. So, after the three championship titles which he won with F.C. Copenhagen, he won his fourth consecutive championship title, this time with APOEL. He was voted by Cyprus Football Association as the player of the season (MVP) 2010–11 in the Cypriot First Division.

He started 2011–12 season in fine form, scoring 4 goals in the UEFA Champions League qualifying rounds that helped APOEL qualify for the group stage of the 2011–12 UEFA Champions League. In the first group stage match against Zenit Saint Petersburg on 13 September 2011, he scored the winner on 75 minutes as his side came from behind to claim a 2–1 victory. On 19 October 2011, he scored the equaliser on 19 minutes as APOEL snatched a 1–1 draw at FC Porto. He followed up that success by scoring from the spot in his side's 2–1 victory over FC Porto in the reverse encounter in Nicosia He also appeared in the round-of-16 triumph over Olympique Lyonnais where he converted his attempt in the penalty shootout. In total, he scored three goals in the group phase and seven overall in the competition, as the club reached the quarter-finals for the first time ever.

He made his last two appearances for APOEL in the 2012–13 season against Aalesunds FK for the second qualifying round of the 2012–13 UEFA Europa League, appearing in both legs and scoring the opening goal in APOEL's 2–0 first leg home win.

Terek Grozny
On 14 September 2012, he made his debut for Terek. He opened the score in a 2–0 away win over the reigning champions Zenit St. Petersburg.

Al-Hilal
In July 2015, he joined Al-Hilal on a one-year contract. Ailton was given Shirt #9 in the league and domestic cups and #99 in the AFC

Saudia Domestic Competitions
Hilal Winning - Saudi Super Cup 2015 Win
 Ailton helped Al Hilal win the Saudi Super Cup, game played vs Derby rivals Al Nasser Club in Saudi Professional League.

2015/16 Saudi Pro League
Ailton Almeida scored 1 Goal in Saudi Professional League's game against Al Wahda Club Club. Al Hilal Won that game 2–0.

Ailton scored 1 goal in Saudi Professional League's game against Al Fateh Club. Al Hilal Won that game 2–1.

2015 Asian Champions League
Ailton played joined Hilal as they were attempting to qualify for the semi finals of the Asian Champion's League glory. In the quarter finals game Al Hilal played against Lakhwia FC of Qatar.

Quarter-finals
Ailton scored 1 goals, and Al Hilal Won 4–1 in first leg of quarter final.

In the second leg Hilal drew with Lakhwia FC 2-2

Return to Örgryte
On 28 January 2019, Almeida returned to Örgryte IS, competing in Superettan, signing a three-year contract.

Career statistics

Honours

Club
Copenhagen
Danish Superliga: 2006–07, 2008–09, 2009–10
Danish Cup: 2008–09

APOEL
Cypriot First Division: 2010–11
Cypriot Super Cup: 2011

Al-Hilal
Saudi Crown Prince Cup: 2015–16
Saudi Super Cup: 2015

Individual
Danish Superliga Spring Profile: 2009
Cypriot First Division Player of the season: 2010–11

References

External links

Profile at APOEL FC

1984 births
Living people
Brazilian footballers
Sportspeople from Minas Gerais
Tupi Football Club players
Clube Atlético Mineiro players
Örgryte IS players
F.C. Copenhagen players
APOEL FC players
FC Akhmat Grozny players
Al Hilal SFC players
Al Jazira Club players
Al Dhafra FC players
Allsvenskan players
Danish Superliga players
Cypriot First Division players
Russian Premier League players
Saudi Professional League players
UAE Pro League players
Brazilian expatriate footballers
Association football forwards
Expatriate footballers in Cyprus
Expatriate men's footballers in Denmark
Expatriate footballers in Russia
Expatriate footballers in Saudi Arabia
Brazilian expatriate sportspeople in Cyprus